Dislike is a 2016 Russian slasher film directed by Pavel Ruminov.

Plot 
The film tells about a group of successful Russian video bloggers who were invited to a country cottage for a tasting of a new energy drink. Once there, they realized that they had fallen into a trap and unwittingly became participants in a quiz in which they had to answer the question: Who ordered your murder?, the wrong answer to which would deprive one of the video bloggers of life.

Cast 
 Anastasiya Akatova as Roksanna
 Evgeniy Dakot as Boris
 Oleg Gaas as Prank
 Maria Lavrova
 Diana Melison
 Nikita Moskovoy
 Aleksandr Panin

References

External links 
 

2016 films
2010s Russian-language films
2010s slasher films
Russian slasher films
Russian comedy horror films
Russian horror thriller films
2016 horror films
Films about social media